The 2017 ISF Men's World Championship is an international softball tournament that took place in Whitehorse, Canada from 7–16 July 2017. It was the 15th time the World Championship took place and the first time Whitehorse hosted the tournament.

Pools composition

Officials

The ISF appointed 21 umpires from 12 national countries to facilitate matches of the tournament. Bob Stanton from Canada is named Umpire in Chief, and Wayne Saunders and Brian Van Os, both from Canada, were named assistant Umpire in Chiefs.

Rosters

Preliminary round

Pool A

|}

Pool B

Pool A

|}

Championship Round

Placement round

Final standings

References

External links
Official Website

ISF Men's World Championship
Sport in Whitehorse
2017 in Canadian sports
Men's Softball World Championship
International softball competitions hosted by Canada
July 2017 sports events in Canada
2017 in Yukon
Sports competitions in Yukon